Dioryche is a genus of beetles in the family Carabidae, containing the following species:

 Dioryche braccata (Bates, 1891) 
 Dioryche cavernosa (Putzeys, 1875) 
 Dioryche chinnada Andrewes, 1921 
 Dioryche clara Andrewes, 1922 
 Dioryche colombensis (Nietner, 1857) 
 Dioryche convexa Andrewes, 1924 
 Dioryche indochinensis (Bates, 1889) 
 Dioryche liparops Andrewes, 1933 
 Dioryche longula (Bates, 1892) 
 Dioryche melanauges Andrewes, 1922 
 Dioryche nagpurensis (Bates, 1891) 
 Dioryche sericea Andrewes, 1922 
 Dioryche solida Andrewes, 1933 
 Dioryche torta W.S.Macleay, 1825 
 Dioryche yunnana Kataev, 2002

References

Harpalinae